Cenocoelius is a genus of hymenopteran insects belonging to the family Braconidae. Those species whose life history has been studied are all koinobiont parasitoids on wood-boring beetle larvae (mainly Cerambycidae and Curculionidae but sometimes Buprestidae).

References

Braconidae genera